Al Haoua Mosque, also known as the Mosque of El Hawa or Ettaoufi, is a mosque in Tunis, Tunisia. It is an official Historical Monument.

Localization 
This mosque is located in the Medina area of the city.

History 
This mosque was built in 1252 by Princess Lady Sovereign Hafsid Atf Abu Zakaria I, mother of Mohamed al Moustancir Billah.  As it fell into ruin, it became subsequently known as "outdoor mosque" because it was built on a hill overlooking the gardens and orchards in a place called "Rawdha Essououd".

When the Andalusians came to Tunis they used it as an educational institution.
Bey Husayn (1705 - 1735) the mosque was renovated.

References

Mosques in Tunis
Mosques completed in 1252
13th-century mosques

Hafsid architecture